Ptolemaeus may refer to:

Ptolemy, a Greek mathematician, astronomer, geographer and astrologer, and things named for him:
Ptolemaeus (lunar crater)
Ptolemaeus (Martian crater)
4001 Ptolemaeus, a Florian asteroid
Ptolemaeus of Commagene, a satrap of Commagene
 Ptolemy (name), including a list of people with the name

See also
Ptolemaios and Ptolemaios 2 are fictional entities in anime television series Mobile Suit Gundam 00 and film Mobile Suit Gundam 00 the Movie: A Wakening of the Trailblazer